The Arnhem Highway is a 227—kilometre highway in the Northern Territory of Australia. It links the mining town of Jabiru, in Kakadu National Park, to the Stuart Highway at a point 35 kilometres south of Darwin.

Upgrades
The Northern Australia Roads Program announced in 2016 included the following project for the Arnhem Highway.

Floodplain upgrade
The project to upgrade the Adelaide River floodplain is to be complete in early 2022 at a total cost of $77.9 million.

Major intersections

See also

 Highways in Australia
 List of highways in the Northern Territory

References

Highways in the Northern Territory